Wheeler is an unincorporated community in Lee County, Virginia. It is the southwesternmost populated place in Virginia. Wheeler is closer to 9 different state capitals (KY, WV, TN, GA, SC, IN, OH, NC, AL) than it is to the capital of its own state (Richmond, 411 miles away).

History
The community was likely named for the Wheeler family of pioneer settlers.

References

Unincorporated communities in Lee County, Virginia
Unincorporated communities in Virginia